Follow-up may refer to:
 Kepler Follow-up Program, a program to follow up possible observations of planets by the Kepler spacecraft
 Followup-To, a kind of internet crossposting
 Follow-up, a patient's revisit in ambulatory care
 Follow-up, a stage in software inspection

See also
 Fagan inspection#Follow-up
 Follow-Up and Arrangement Committee, a former alliance of Iraqi opposition groups
 Lost to follow-up
 Sequel
 Spin-off (media)